Virola divergens is a species of tree in the family Myristicaceae.  It grows to about 25m tall.  The fruits are ellipsoidal and subglobular, 18–38 mm long and 16–33 mm in diameter, grouped 4 to 8.

Distribution 
Virola divergens' native range is SE. Colombia to Peru and N. Brazil. It grows at altitudes of 100–240 metres.

See also
Psychedelic plants

References

divergens
Medicinal plants of South America